Yu with macron (Ю̄ ю̄; italics: Ю̄ю̄) is a letter of the Cyrillic script. Its ligature is derived from the Cyrillic letter Yu (Юю) by adding a hugižila (хугижила) on top.

Yu with macron is used in the Aleut (Bering dialect), Evenki, Mansi, Nanai, Negidal, Orok, Ulch, Kildin Sami, Selkup and Chechen languages.

References

See also 
 Cyrillic characters in Unicode

Cyrillic letters with diacritics
Letters with macron